Mayestan-e Pain (also Romanized as Māyestān-e Pā’īn; also known as Māyestān-e Soflá) is a village in Siyarastaq Yeylaq Rural District, Rahimabad District, Rudsar County, Gilan Province, Iran. At the 2006 census, its population was 84, in 30 families.

References 

Populated places in Rudsar County